Kumite Classic Entertainment (KCE) is a Pittsburgh, Pennsylvania based sports production company. It was established in 1999 by Bill Viola Jr. KCE specializes in fitness, martial arts, and multi-sport competitions.

The Kumite Classic
“Kumite” is a Japanese word referring to “fighting.” The company's self-titled “Kumite Classic” is an annual series of combat sports tournaments, widely regarded as the mecca of martial arts in the Pittsburgh region.

The Kumite Classic has traditionally featured strongman, powerlifting, body building, fitness, figure, and model competitions. The Kumite Classic showcases traditional and open karate, tae kwon do, tang soo do,  kung fu, Brazilian Jiu-Jitsu and Grappling tournaments.

Notable martial arts and sports celebrities including Royce Gracie, Franco Harris, Antonio Brown, Lynn Swan, Ice-T and Kurt Angle have appeared at the Kumite Classic. Angle's “Ultimate Teen Challenge,” a strength competition, was launched at the 2005 Kumite Classic and has also expanded to the Arnold Sports Festival.

Kumite Classic Entertainment took ownership of Allegheny Shotokan Karate in 2016.

Pittsburgh Fitness Expo
Kumite Classic hosts the annual Pittsburgh Fitness Expo, a full scale consumer convention that promotes health and wellness in the Western Pennsylvania region. The expo is held at the Monroeville Convention Center over Memorial Day Weekend.

Publishing
In 2013, the company established Kumite Classic Press and released Godfathers of MMA, a mixed martial arts non-fiction book inspired by the life of Bill Viola Sr. and the rise and fall of CV Productions and the Tough Guy Contest. The book is the subject of the documentary film Tough Guys (2017) produced by MinusL Inc.

Kumite Classic published a commemorative edition of Godfather's of MMA retitled Tough Guys (2017) which peaked at #1 on the Amazon best sellers list in the individual sports category. The launch was synchronized with the network television debut of Tough Guys on Showtime.

Published works
Viola Jr., Bill (2014). Godfathers of MMA: The Birth of an American Sport. Kumite Classic Entertainment.
Viola Jr., Bill (2016). Go Ask Your Dad: Questions, Answers, and Stories about Fathers, Fatherhood, and Being a Parent (Volume 1). Kumite Classic Entertainment. 
Viola Jr., Bill (2017). Tough Guys. Kumite Classic Entertainment. 
Viola Jr., Bill (2020). CommonSensei: Sensei Says. Kumite Classic Entertainment. 
Viola Jr., Bill (2020). CommonSensei: Goal Pagoda. Kumite Classic Entertainment.

References

External links
Official Website
Pittsburgh Fitness Expo

Sports organizations established in 1999
Martial arts competitions
Recurring sporting events established in 1999
Multi-sport events
1999 establishments in Pennsylvania